The Bathers (French: Les Grandes Baigneuses) is an oil painting by French artist Paul Cézanne first exhibited in 1906. The painting, which is exhibited in the Philadelphia Museum of Art, is the largest of a series of Bather paintings by Cézanne; the others are in the Museum of Modern Art in New York City, National Gallery, London, the Barnes Foundation, Pennsylvania, and the Art Institute of Chicago. Occasionally referred to as the Big Bathers or Large Bathers to distinguish it from the smaller works, the painting is considered one of the masterpieces of modern art, and is often considered Cézanne's finest work.

Cézanne worked on the painting for seven years, and it remained unfinished at the time of his death in 1906. The painting was purchased in 1937 for $110,000 with funds from a trust fund for the Philadelphia Museum of Art by their major benefactor, Joseph E. Widener.  It was previously owned by Leo Stein.

With each version of the Bathers, Cézanne moved away from the traditional presentation of paintings, intentionally creating works that would not appeal to the novice viewer. He did this to avoid fleeting fads and give a timeless quality to his work, and in so doing paved the way for future artists to disregard current trends and paint pieces that would appeal equally to all generations. The abstract nude females present in Large Bathers give the painting tension and density. It is exceptional among his work in symmetrical dimensions, with the adaptation of the nude forms to the triangular pattern of the trees and river. Using the same technique as employed in painting landscapes and still lifes, Large Bathers is reminiscent of the work of Titian and Peter Paul Rubens. Comparisons are also often made with the other famous group of nude women of the same period, Picasso's Les Demoiselles d'Avignon.

The purchase of the painting, while generally praised, was nevertheless questioned by The Philadelphia Record, which noted that 41,000 (or ten percent) of Philadelphia's residents were without bathtubs, and that the money could therefore have been better spent elsewhere. While Cézanne's drawing ability has always been criticized, a critic once said that he "made the ineptly drawn Bathers a warm evocation of leisurely summer bliss." The painting was featured in the 1980 BBC Two series 100 Great Paintings.

Other versions

See also
List of paintings by Paul Cézanne

References

External links

The Bathers at the Philadelphia Museum of Art
The Bathers at the National Gallery

1902 paintings
1900s paintings
Paintings by Paul Cézanne
Paintings in the collection of the Philadelphia Museum of Art
Collections of the National Gallery, London
Nude art
Paintings in the collection of the Art Institute of Chicago
Bathing in art
Unfinished paintings
Paintings in the collection of the Hermitage Museum